Jamshoro is a city and the capital of Jamshoro District, located in Sindh, Pakistan.

This city is popularly known as Education City. Four major universities of Sindh are located in the vicinity of this city.

History

Ranikot Fort is a historical fort near Sann, Jamshoro District, Sindh, Pakistan. Since 1993, it has been on the tentative list of UNESCO World Heritage Sites.

Archaeologists point to the 17th century as its time of first construction but now Sindh archaeologists agree that some of the present structure was reconstructed by Mir Karam Ali Khan Talpur Baloch and his brother Mir Murad Ali Baloch in 1812 at a cost of 1.2 million rupees (Sindh Gazetteer, 677).

Universities
 University of Sindh
 Mehran University of Engineering and Technology
 Liaquat University of Medical and Health Sciences

Schools and colleges
 Cadet College Petaro
 Pak Turk International School & College Jamshoro
 The City School Jamshoro campus
 The Educators Branch Jamshoro
 Rockford Cambridge School Branch Jamshoro
 Pioneers School and college jamshoro campus

Location
Jamshoro, is situated on the right bank of the Indus River at south-west position of Province of Sindh sloping from direction North-east to south-west and is about 18 kilometers far from Hyderabad and at a distance of 150 kilometers from Karachi.

Demographics

The population of Jamshoro District increased from 582,094 in 1998 to 1,176,969 in 2011, an increase of 102.2%. Roughly, 95% of the Population of the city consists of immigrants from various parts of interior Sindh who migrated to the town in around 1948-2001 & to a lesser extent from 2002 to 2014 decades. Therefore, the city holds a number of diverse Sindhi clans & ethnic groups mainly from Jamshoro District, Dadu District, Sukkur District, Larkana District, Khairpur District, Umarkot District, Matiari District, Nawabshah District, Shikarpur District, Tharparker, Naushahro Feroze District, Badin District & Jacobabad District. The city is predominantly Sindhi with a substantial community of Pathans, Baloch people & Seraikis. Small communities of Brahuis, Punjabis, & to a lesser extent Muhajir people are also present.

Jamshoro is predominantly Muslim with a small Hindu minority.

See also
 Hyderabad, Sindh

References

External links
 In Jamshoro, hopes and unfufilled promises for people
 Introduction to Jamshoro – University of Sindh Jamshoro

 
Jamshoro District
Cities in Pakistan
Education City